In the Forest  is a 2002 novel by Irish novelist Edna O'Brien. The novel is set in Ireland, and is based on a triple homicide: the 1994 murder of Imelda Riney, her son Liam and Catholic priest Fr Joe Walsh by Brendan O'Donnell.

References 

2002 Irish novels
Novels by Edna O'Brien
Novels set in Ireland
Irish crime novels
Novels about murder